Short fuse and similar may refer to:
 Short Fuse Blues, 1990 debut album by Australian blues singer and guitarist Dave Hole
 Short-Fuze (G.I. Joe), a fictional character in the G.I. Joe universe
 "Short Fuse", another name for Good to Go (film) 1986
 "Short Fuse" (1972), sixth episode of the first season of TV series Columbo

See also 
 Fuse (disambiguation)
 Fuze